Jill Green is an American dance educator and scholar.

Jill Green may also refer to:

Jill Green (politician), Canadian politician from New Brunswick
Jill Green (Friends), fictional character from the U.S. sitcom Friends
Jill Green (EastEnders), fictional character from the British soap opera EastEnders